Saralanj (also Romanized as Saralandzh and Saralandj; formerly, Gey Yekhush) is a town in the Lori Province of Armenia.

References

Populated places in Lori Province